Nils Henning Vogt (born ) is a Norwegian actor who is best known for some of his comedy roles, particularly as the temperamental small business owner Karl Reverud in the sit-coms Mot i brøstet (which he also directed) from 1993 to 1997, Karl & Co from 1998 to 2001 and Karl III in 2009. Vogt has also played in several theatrical roles, including musical comedy. Vogt started acting Arnfinn Lycke in the TV 2 soap opera Hotel Cæsar in January 2011.

References and external links
Store norske leksikon, entry on Nils Vogt. (Online)

1948 births
Living people
Norwegian male stage actors
Norwegian male television actors
Norwegian male soap opera actors